Mario Faig (1905–1984) was an Argentine film actor. Faig appeared in twenty films during his career. He was married to the actress Gloria Ugarte.

Selected filmography
 Valentina (1950)
 The Fan (1951)

References

Bibliography 
 Insaurralde, Andrés. Manuel Romero. Centro Editor de América Latina, 1994.

External links 
 

1905 births
1984 deaths
Argentine male film actors
20th-century Argentine male actors